Ralph Grey may refer to:

 Ralph Grey, Baron Grey of Naunton (1910–1999), last Governor of Northern Ireland
 Ralph Grey (MP) (1819–1869), British Whig politician
 Ralph Grey, 4th Baron Grey of Werke (died 1706), English peer who served as Governor of Barbados

See also
 Ralph Gray (disambiguation)